Defence Institute of Advanced Technology (DIAT) is the premier engineering training institute under the Department of Defence Research & Development, Ministry of Defence, Government of India. DIAT (DU) is specialized in the training of officers of Defence Research Organizations, IOFS (Indian Ordnance Factories), Defence PSUs (Like Hindustan Aeronautics Limited, Bharat Electronics, Bharat Dynamics Limited), ship building agencies like Garden Reach Shipbuilders & Engineers, Cochin and Goa Shipyards, Mazagon Dock Shipbuilders and armed forces of friendly countries (like Sri Lanka and Afghanistan,) and other central and state government agencies.

Ministry of Human Resource Development, Government of India has placed DIAT in Category 'A' Deemed University  & accredited by National Assessment and Accreditation Council and National Board of Accreditation. During the last few years, researchers in DIAT have filed more than 50 patent applications with Indian Patent Office and published more than 2000 papers in various journals of International repute.

History 

Indian Armament Studies, later renamed as Institute of Armament Technology (now Defence Institute of Advanced Technology -  DIAT) is founded by Patrick Blackett (Nobel Laureate-Physics-1948) and Daulat Singh Kothari (Padma Bushan & Padma Vibhushan) on 1952.

Patrick Blackett was a Nobel Laureate (Physics-1948) and a Military Expert, Royal British Navy was invited by Jawahar Lal Nehru, the first Prime Minister of India to 'Indianize the military' during 1950s.  Blackett was awarded the Royal Medal by the Royal Society in 1940 and the American Medal for Merit in 1946. Patrick Blackett was Head of the Physics Department of Imperial College London . The current Physics department building of Imperial College is named the Blackett Laboratory.

Daulat Singh Kothari (Padma Bushan & Padma Vibhushan), Scientific Advisor to Ministry of Defence, Government of India is an Outstanding Physicist, Educationalist and considered as the Architect of Defence Science in India. Founder of most of the DRDO labs in India i.e. Naval Dockyard Laboratory (later renamed Naval Chemical and Metallurgical Laboratory), Mumbai, Indian Naval Physical Laboratory, Kochi, Centre for Fire Research, Delhi, Solid State Physics Laboratory, Delhi, Defence Food Research Laboratory, Mysore, Defence Institute of Physiology and Allied Sciences, Chennai, Directorate of Psychological Research, New Delhi, Defence Electronics Research Laboratory, Hyderabad, Scientific Evaluation Group, Delhi, Terminal Ballistic Research Laboratory, Chandigarh. D S Kothari Played a crucial role in setting up of UGC and NCERT.

A. P. J. Abdul Kalam in his recent book, Ignited Minds: Unleashing the Power Within India. wrote, “Dr. D.S. Kothari, a professor at Delhi University, was an outstanding physicist and astrophysicist. He is well-known for ionisation of matter by pressure in cold compact object like planets. This theory is complementary to the epoch making theory of thermal ionisation of his guru, Maghnad Saha. Dr. D.S. Kothari set a scientific tradition in Indian defence tasks when he became Scientific Advisor to Defence Minister in 1948. The first thing he did was to establish the Defence Science Centre to do research in electronic materials, nuclear medicine and ballistic science.

Dr. D S Kothari and Dr. P Blackett worked together in Cavendish Laboratory, Cambridge University under the guidance of Ernest Rutherford, the Father of Nuclear physics.

In 1967, Indian Armament Studies was renamed as "Institute of Armament Technology" (IAT), which moved to its present location at Girinagar, Pune. From the relatively narrow scope of Armament Studies alone in the Fifties, the role of the institute was considerably enlarged by the Defence R&D Council in 1964 and further in 1981.

On the basis of accreditation by the All India Council of Technical Education (AICTE), Pune University recognised eight courses for the award of ME degree in 1980. In the year 2000, the institute acquired the status of a Deemed University. IAT has been renamed as DIAT w.e.f. 1 April 2006.

DIAT ranked 35th position (under University category) in the Nation's first National Institutional Ranking Framework introduced by the Ministry of Education during 2016.

DIAT is supported by 52 laboratories of Defence Research & Development Organization, Defence PSUs and Indian Armed Forces to conduct collaborative research works and to validate, assess various innovative technologies developed by its students and researchers.

Founders & Guides of DIAT
Padma Vibhushan Dr D S Kothari: Scientific Advisor to Raksha Mantri (SA to RM) (1948-1961)
Col. H M Paterson RMCS, Shivenham UK: The man behind 'Paterson Report' formed the Genesis of IAT
Brig. L S Anand: 1st Director of Military Studies, IAS Kirkee Year 1952
Prof. S Bhagavantam SA to RM, DG R&D (1961-1970)
Dr. BD Nagchaudhuri SA to RM, DG R&D Secretary Def. R&D (1970-1974)
Padma Bhushan Prof. MGK Menon FRS, SA to RM, DG R&D Secretary Def. R&D (1974-1978)
Padma Vibhushan Dr. Raja Ramanna, SA to RM, DG R&D Secretary Def. R&D (1978-1982)
Padma Vibhushan Dr. V S Arunachalam, SA to RM, DG R&D Secretary Def. R&D (1982-1992)
Bharat Ratna Dr. APJ Abdul Kalam, SA to RM, DG R&D Secretary Def. R&D (1992-1999)
Padma Bhushan Dr. V K Aatre, SA to RM, DG R&D Secretary Def. R&D (1999-2004)

Courses 

DIAT is engaged in imparting technical education, in niche areas at PG (MTech) & PhD levels over the last 60 years, in its various forms & capacities. The main focus of the institute is to develop indigenous contemporary defence-related technologies. The university is spread over 496 acres.

In order to meet the specific and futuristic training requirements of Armed Forces, DIAT (DU) was bifurcated to form Military Institute of Technology (MILIT), Pune which is an inter-service institution of Integrated Defence Staff, an organisation responsible for fostering coordination and enabling prioritisation across the different branches of the Indian Armed Forces. MILIT trains officers of the three Services of Indian Armed Forces which are Army, Navy, Air Force and officers from friendly foreign countries for command and staff appointments. It conducts short term certificate courses (TTC, TSOC) for the Officers of the Three services.

Recently DIAT started certification program  in the Area of Cybersecurity and Artificial Intelligence & Machine Learning, the selection to this course  will be based on DIAT Entrance Exam, the duration of this intensive training program last around 3 months .

Rankings

Defence Institute of Advanced Technology was ranked 71 among engineering category by the National Institutional Ranking Framework (NIRF) in 2022.

Collaborative research programmes 
DIAT signed collaborative research program, faculty/students exchange programs with reputed International Universities/Organizations like Cranfield University UK, Naval Postgraduate School USA, Technion Israel, Belarus State University Belarus, Deakin University Australia, University of Warwick UK, Military Technical Academy Vietnam, Nanyang Technological University Singapore, National University of Singapore, Dassault Aviation (Rafale) India Ltd, Boeing India Ltd, etc. and National Universities/Organizations like BARC, DST, IITs, NITS, NIITS, IIIT, ATIRA, CIPET, State Universities etc.

Fight against coronavirus 
In order to support the country's effort to contain the spread of the novel Corona pandemic, DIAT (DU) developed a  cost-effective solution to disintegrate coronavirus. A microwave sterilizer named as ‘ATULYA' can be operated in portable or fixed installations and helps in disintegrating the virus by differential heating in the range of 56 to 60 Celsius temperatures. Atulya weighs around three kilograms and it can be used for sterilization of non-metallic objects only. Depending on the size and shape of  objects, sterilization time may vary from 30 seconds to one minute. Professor K.P. Ray is the co-innovator with Maser Electronics Private Limited.

Pune based Defence Institute of Advanced Technology, DIAT (DU) developed a Nanofibres of Ayurvedic based Biodegradable Face Mask which acts a virus neutraliser to resist against the bacteria / virus, and has named “Pavitrapati”. Accordingly, the Transfer of Technology [ToT] / NDA of this product signed in June 2020 between DIAT and Kolhapur based Textile Company M/s. Siddheshwar Techtessile Pvt. Ltd., Maharashtra, for actual development to this product on mass level to contain the spread of the COVID-19 virus. The company now launched its first ever Aurvedic based biodegradable face mask named “Pavitrapati” for sale. M/s Siddheshwar Techtessile Pvt. Ltd., Maharashtra developed initially 10,000 Nos of this mask and have got responses from distributors, sales teams, pharmaceutical companies and the same will be made available on online platform like. Amazon, Flipkart etc. Another ToT has been transferred to M/s. Siddheshwar Techtessile Pvt. Ltd., Maharashtra by DIAT for development of anti-microbial body suit in the name of “Aushada tara”. This suit has superhydrophobic, breathing, anti-microbial, comfort feeling properties. The fabric material of the suit has the approval for fighting against the COVID-19. The suit had cleared the splash resistant tests and it has got good repellent property of any fluids. The demand of this suit will be for medical hospitals, private companies, airlines and Govt agencies. The production of the Aushada Tara has started and the initial order is already placed and executed.

A herbal extract obtained from neem oil, turmeric, tulsi (holy basil), ajwain (carom seeds), black pepper, gum arabic, clove, sandalwood and saffron has been used in the non-woven nano-fibre of this three-layered biodegradable mask, named 'pavitrapati" invented by  Prof Balasubramanian K. Professor & Dean, DIAT (DU).

Boarding

Accommodation and mess facilities are available in the POINTS Hostel on payment basis. More than 200 rooms are available for the accommodation of students in the DIAT (DU). The POINTS hostel building is very well planned (common lift in al buildings and covered parking for vehicles) and each room is having attached Toilet, Bathroom, Telephone, Geysers, WI-FI facility, etc. Currently, rooms are provided on a twin sharing basis and each room can accommodate up to maximum 4 students.  Accommodation including food and room service will cost approximately Rs. 150 per day.

Other than existing POINTS hostel facilities, a separate hostel (6 floors/100 rooms) exclusively for girl students with all most modern facilities which can accommodate more than 400 girl students is inaugurated in January 2021

Also, another hostel with 14 studio apartments for married students and 100 rooms with modern facilities exclusively for boys students is under construction in the campus (completion expected by June 2022)

Other than hostels, DIAT (DU) is providing Quarters (Type 1 to 6) for its employees and Guest House for Visitors on campus. Married students are also eligible to get quarters as per the rules and regulations of DIAT (DU) during their stay in DIAT.

References

External links
 

Defence Research and Development Organisation laboratories
Research institutes in Pune
Deemed universities in Maharashtra
Research and development in India
Research institutes established in 1952
1952 establishments in Bombay State